Paul Gordon Comrie (born February 7, 1977) is a Canadian former professional ice hockey forward. He played in the National Hockey League (NHL) with the Edmonton Oilers during the 1999–00 season.

Hockey player
Before his short professional career, Paul played for the Fort Saskatchewan Traders, and then for the University of Denver from 1996 until 1999. He was selected in the 9th round of the 1997 NHL Entry Draft, 224th overall, by the Tampa Bay Lightning, but never played for them. On December 30, 1997, the Lightning traded Comrie, along with Roman Hamrlik, to the Edmonton Oilers (the team his brother, Mike Comrie, also played for) in exchange for Bryan Marchment, Steve Kelly, and Jason Bonsignore. He played in fifteen NHL games for the Oilers during the 1999–00 season. Comrie was forced to retire at the age of 24 due to concussion problems.

Business career
Comrie, who studied business at the University of Denver, is the oldest son of Bill Comrie, founder of the home furnishings store The Brick. Following his retirement from hockey, Comrie entered into the family business, The Brick, as Case Goods Buyer in 2002 and Director of Imports in 2003. From 2004 onwards, Comrie was appointed to various executive positions and as a director of the Brick:

 President of United Furniture Warehouse LP 2004-2006
 Vice President, Merchandising, Furniture and Mattresses of the Brick Group Income Fund 2006-2008
 Chief Merchandising Officer of the Brick Group Income Fund 2008–2014
 Chief Executive Officer of Elements International 2014–Present

Transactions
 December 20, 1997 – Comrie and Roman Hamrlik traded to Edmonton by Tampa Bay in exchange for Jason Bonsignore, Steve Kelly, and Bryan Marchment

Personal life
Comrie's half-brother Eric plays goal for the Buffalo Sabres of the National Hockey League. He was selected 59th overall in the 2013 NHL draft by the Winnipeg Jets.

Comrie is the former brother-in-law of Hilary Duff, through brother Mike, who also played for the Oilers.

Career statistics

Regular season and playoffs

Awards and honours

References

External links 

1977 births
Living people
AHCA Division I men's ice hockey All-Americans
Canadian ice hockey forwards
Denver Pioneers men's ice hockey players
Edmonton Oilers players
Hamilton Bulldogs (AHL) players
San Diego Barracudas players
Ice hockey people from Edmonton
Tampa Bay Lightning draft picks